David Jeffrey  (born 28 October 1962) is a Northern Irish football manager and former player, who currently manages Ballymena United. He is best known for managing Linfield between 1997 and 2014. He began his professional playing career with the club, following a spell in the Manchester United youth team, and also played for Ards and Larne.

Personal life
Born in Newtownards, Jeffrey attended Dundonald High School and Sullivan Upper School. He lives in Glengormley, and has a career in social work alongside his management career. He has two sons, Gareth and Thomas, and is a member of both the Orange Order and a flute band. He cites his parents as the biggest inspiration in his life.

Jeffrey is a Christian. In an interview with the Belfast Telegraph in 2020, he described himself as having 'an unapologetic and unashamed very strong faith in God'.

Playing career
Jeffrey began his football career as a schoolboy with Manchester United, but never played in the first team. He joined Linfield in the summer of 1982. He played for Linfield for 10 years and was club captain for much of that time. Jeffrey scored the crucial away goal against Shamrock Rovers in the 1984–85 European Cup. He left Windsor Park for his hometown club, Ards in the summer of 1992 reuniting him with former boss Roy Coyle and in February 1995 joined Larne as player-coach.

Managerial career

Linfield
In April 1996, Jeffrey returned to Linfield as assistant manager to Trevor Anderson. Jeffrey was appointed as Linfield manager on 4 January 1997 after Anderson resigned.

In the 2005–06 season, Jeffrey guided Linfield to a clean sweep of domestic trophies, missing out only on the cross-border All-Ireland Cup. On 6 June 2006, Jeffrey signed a new four-year contract, the longest contract in Linfield history. His previous deal had one season left to run.

In June 2008, Jeffrey won his 23rd manager of the month award, breaking the record for monthly awards. By January 2014, he had extended this record to 32 awards.

Alongside Roy Coyle, Jeffrey is Linfield's most successful manager in history, having won 31 trophies during his 17-year tenure. Roy Coyle also won 31 trophies with the Blues during his managerial career from 1975 to 1990.

On 15 February 2014, Jeffrey announced that he was to step down as manager of Linfield at the end of the 2013–14 season. He was replaced by former Northern Ireland international, Warren Feeney.

Ballymena United
On 7 March 2016, it was announced that Jeffrey had been appointed the new manager of Ballymena United, following the sacking of Glenn Ferguson.

Jeffrey guided Ballymena to winning the Northern Irish League cup in 2016–17 season and took them to the quarter-finals of the Irish Cup and a 4th place finish in the league.

Jeffrey was appointed Member of the Order of the British Empire (MBE) in the 2021 Birthday Honours for services to association football and community relations in Northern Ireland.

Managerial statistics

Managerial honours
Linfield
Irish Premier League/IFA Premiership (9): 1999–2000, 2000–01, 2003–04, 2005–06, 2006–07, 2007–08, 2009–10, 2010–11, 2011–12
Irish Cup (7): 2001–02, 2005–06, 2006–07, 2007–08, 2009–10, 2010–11, 2011–12
Irish League Cup (6): 1997–98, 1998–99, 1999–2000, 2001–02, 2005–06, 2007–08
County Antrim Shield (6): 1997–98, 2000–01, 2003–04, 2004–05, 2005–06, 2013–14
Setanta Cup: 2005
Irish FA Charity Shield: 2000
Irish League Floodlit Cup: 1997–98

Ballymena United
Northern Ireland Football League Cup: 2016–17

References

1962 births
Living people
Association footballers from Northern Ireland
Association football defenders
NIFL Premiership players
Manchester United F.C. players
Linfield F.C. players
Ards F.C. players
Larne F.C. players
Football managers from Northern Ireland
Linfield F.C. managers
Ballymena United F.C. managers
People educated at Sullivan Upper School
Members of the Order of the British Empire
Christians from Northern Ireland